The Supreme Artist Hall is a museum in Khlong Luang District, Pathum Thani Province, Thailand.

It was constructed to showcase Thailand's National Artists. The hall is named in honour of King Bhumibol Adulyadej, also referred to as the "Supreme Artist" for his contributions music and photography.

References

External links
Website of the Supreme Artist Hall (Thai)

Art museums and galleries in Thailand
Buildings and structures in Pathum Thani province
Tourist attractions in Pathum Thani province